SS Fairview was a wood-burning sternwheeler built at Okanagan Landing shipyard in 1894 to run between the communities Penticton and Okanagan Falls, British Columbia, Canada. She was built by M. E. Cousens, chief of engineer of the Canadian Pacific Railway company-owned , and was the second steamship built at Okanagan Landing after Aberdeen. Although she was intended to run on Okanagan River between Penticton and Okanagan Falls, then called Dogtown, Fairview was too large for the river and was instead used for passenger and freight service on Okanagan Lake. Fairview caught fire at Okanagan Landing on the return trip from an excursion and burned in 1897.

References

History of British Columbia
Culture of the Okanagan
Paddle steamers of British Columbia
Steamboats of Okanagan Lake